The Typographical Association (TA) was a trade union representing typographers in the United Kingdom and Ireland.

History
The National Typographical Association collapsed in 1848, and delegates from across Yorkshire and Lancashire met at Angel Street in Sheffield to found the Provincial Typographical Association, intended to recreate the former Northern Typographical Union and to focus on paying benefits to members on strike.  The union grew gradually from 481 members at the end of 1849 to 5,300 in 1877.  In that year, it merged with a related relief association and dropped "Provincial" from its title.

Based in Manchester, the union focussed on demanding members serve a seven-year apprenticeship.  In 1894, it began admitting women.  In the 1910s, the Association established a branch in London, but the Trades Union Congress instituted arbitration which restricted it from a fifteen-mile radius of central London, the rival London Society of Compositors having rights to organise in the city.

By 1946, membership had reached 13,958.  In 1964, the Association merged with the London Typographical Society to create the National Graphical Association.

Election results
The union sponsored Labour Party candidates in several Parliamentary elections, many of whom won election.

In both the 1910 elections, Roberts was elected by taking second place in a two-seat constituency.

Leadership

General Secretaries
1849: Josephus Speak
1865: Henry Roberts
1869: Henry Slatter
1897: Richard Hackett
1900: A. W. Jones
1900: Herbert Skinner
1934: John Fletcher
1942: Harry Riding
1955: F. C. Blackburn
1957: John Bonfield

General Presidents
1852: William Dronfield
1855:
1886: Owen Connellan
1888: Daniel Bird
1889:
1891: Richard Hackett
1892:
1893: Richard Hackett
1897:
1899: O. Waddington
1902: H. Matthewman
1908: John H. Boothman
1913: Jimmy French
1934: Hugh Inglis
1949: F. C. Blackburn
1955: John Bonfield
1957: Fred Simmons

References
Arthur Marsh, Victoria Ryan and John B. Smethurst, Historical Directory of Trade Unions
Albert Edward Musson, The Typographical Association: Origins and History Up to 1949

Specific

External links
Catalogue of the TA archives, held at the Modern Records Centre, University of Warwick

 
1849 establishments in the United Kingdom
1964 disestablishments in the United Kingdom
Defunct trade unions of the United Kingdom
Typesetters
Printing trade unions
Trade unions established in the 1840s
Trade unions disestablished in 1964
Trade unions based in Greater Manchester